Erdek Gulf is a gulf of Marmara Sea, Turkey. It is administratively a part of Balıkesir Province.
In fact, the gulf is named after Erdek, an ilçe (district) of the Balıkesir Province which is situated at the north coast of the gulf .
Kapıdağ Peninsula, Paşalimanı Island and Avşa Island are to the north, Belkıs Tombolo (connecting Kapıdağ Peninsula to the Anatolia mainland) is to the east, Karabiga ilçe is to the west and the Marmara coast of Anatolia is to the south.

There are ferry services in the gulf. One service is to Barbaros in the Thracen side of Turkey, close to Tekirdağ. There are also ferry services to the nearby islands such as Marmara Island (Saraylar terminal), Avşa Island and the Paşalimanı Island.

References

Balıkesir Province
Erdek
Gulfs of Turkey